Ika North East is a Local Government Area of Delta State, Nigeria. Its headquarters are in the town of Owa Oyibu.
 
It has an area of 463 km and a population of 183,657 at the 2006 census.

The postal code of the area is 321.

Cities, towns and communities
 Achara
 Agban
 Akpama
 Ekwuoma is a town with this quarters ...odopo,  umuosi,  idumute,  oduga, idumuech....long live Ekwuoma 
 
 Akumazi
 Aliegbo
 Alilor
 Aliobume
 Aliojeh
 Alugba
 Aniekpukwu
 Anieyime
 Aninwachokor
 Ase
 Boji-Boji-Owa
 Eje
 Etiti
 Ibiegwa
 Idumuigwe
 Idumuobior
 Idumuozeh
 Idum-Ile
 Idumu-Oba
 Idumu-Obi
 Idumu-Ukpa
 Idumu-Uleje
 Idumu-Uzougbo
 Ikeze
 Illabor
 Imike
 Isaiah Camp
 Isiube
 Itamuzun
 Mbiri - Mbiri is a town bordered by Umunede, Emuhu, Oligie and Ekpun.  It is estimated to have about 50,000 people in population.  The vast majority of population is subsistence farmers. The title given to the traditional ruler is Obi. The traditional ruler of Mbiri is His Royal Highness Obi Ifeanyi Alekwe JP.
 Mbiri Farm Settlement
 Ndobu
 Obgute
 Obi
 Obi-Quarter
 Obume
 Oduga
 Ogbe
 Ogbe-Akpu
 Ogbe-Obi
 Okete
 Orji
 Otolokpo
 Owa-Alero
 Owa-Alidinma
 Owa-Aliozomor
 Owa-Ekei
 Owa-Ofie
Owa-Oyibu LGA headquarters
 Owanta-Idumuetor
 Owerre-Olubor
 Ugbeka
 Umuagboma
 Umuhu
 Umukpulu
 Umunede
 Ute
 Ute-Alohen
 Ute-Enugu
 Ute-Erumu
 Ute-Owerri

Notable people
Sam Obi, Ex-speaker and former acting governor of Delta State
 Ifeanyi Okowa, Current Governor of Delta State, Nigeria since 2015 and former Senator of the Federal Republic of Nigeria

References

External links
Ika Weekly Newspaper

Local Government Areas in Delta State